The San Diego County Fair (formerly called the Del Mar Fair) is a county fair held every summer at the Del Mar Fairgrounds in Del Mar, California. The fair is a major draw for San Diego County residents; in recent years, attendance figures have risen above a million annually, reaching a record attendance of 1,609,481 in 2016. As of 2016, the San Diego County Fair was the largest county fair in the United States, and the fifth largest fair of any kind.

Fair patrollers include security guards and the San Diego County Sheriff's Office.

History
The fair began in 1880 as an agricultural fair. The location moved from place to place for several years, finally settling on the Del Mar Fairgrounds when it opened in 1936. There was no fair in 1917–18 because of World War I, 1942–45 because of World War II, and 2020 in response to the COVID-19 pandemic.

In 1954, the fair's name was changed to the Southern California Exposition and San Diego County Fair. In 1970, this was shortened to the Southern California Exposition. The fair was again renamed in 1984 to the Del Mar Fair, which lasted until 2002 when the name San Diego County Fair was reinstated. It is sometimes still referred to as the "Del Mar Fair" by locals.

After visiting farm animals at the fair in 2019, a 2-year-old boy died and three others were sickened but not hospitalized; they had contracted pathogenic E. coli, and the child had developed a kidney infection.

Fairest of the Fair
From 1936 through 2003 the fair included a beauty pageant. The winner was originally called Queen of the Fair; in 1947 the title was changed to Fairest of the Fair. The winner and her "court of lovelies" were featured at the fair and in public appearances throughout the year. In 2004 the pageant was discontinued due to high costs and legal wrangling over a disqualified entry in 2003. Most Memorable Contestant was 1979 Marlene Rosas of El Cajon, and the best known winner of the Fairest of the Fair pageant was the late 1958 winner, a La Jolla High School student named Raquel Tejada, better known as actress Raquel Welch (1940-2023).

Don Diego
For decades  the official greeter and host of the fair was Don Diego, a smiling caballero portrayed by Spanish actor Tommy Hernandez from 1947 until his death in 1984. The character was based on a real person, Don Diego Alvarado, whose family had a large land grant in the Del Mar area during the late 1800s; Alvarado was known for his grand parties and was regarded as the local symbol of a gracious host. Dressed in a huge sombrero, embroidered tunic and trousers, and boots, and toting a guitar, Hernandez promoted the fair as its goodwill ambassador. He escorted the Fairest of the Fair and other celebrities, and personally greeted ordinary fairgoers with a "¡Bienvenidos Amigos!" ("Welcome, Friends)".

After Hernandez' death the fair board decided to retire the character rather than try to replace Hernandez, who they felt had been uniquely qualified for the role of Don Diego. A 16-foot bronze statue of Hernandez as Don Diego, created by artist Maher Morcos, now stands at the fair's main entrance. The fair established a scholarship fund in 1986, the Don Diego fund, in his honor.  Each year the statue is dressed in garb that is appropriate to the theme of that year's fair.

Features
The fair features many musical and talent performances from artists of varying genres, from nationally known acts on the infield stage to local professionals to amateur groups. There are dozens of contests ranging from agricultural efforts to cooking to flower arranging.

As with many county fairs, animal exhibits are abundant. There are also two buildings full of commercial exhibits. There are exhibits featuring San Diego County's heritage, as well as exhibits specially designed for the fair's theme, which changes annually, making the fair somewhat different each year. This year's theme is "Get Out  There!".

Children and students are honored in the Kids' Best and Student Showcase displays, which feature artwork created by students ranging from  kindergarten through community college. School yearbooks are displayed as well as woodworking, photography, and art projects constructed by high school students. All ages can display their talents in exhibits such as Design in Wood, photo and art shows, and Home and Hobby. Each day features a particular city or town in San Diego County.

Food also is a feature of the fair, with more than 100 food booths. There are many fair classics as well as  other interesting or outrageous creations such as beef sundaes, fried Twinkies, and apple fries. Something new is added every year, such as fried cola in 2007, chocolate bacon in 2009, and fried butter in 2010. In 2015 the new Fair fare is an eclectic mix of pork and bacon to sweets and spice - and much more. 2019 saw the debut of the Buffalo Chicken Chimichanga. From Wasabi Bacon Bombs to Sriracha Corn Dogs, Deep-fried Slimfast Bars, and a Fireball Donut, there is a lot to eat and see at the San Diego County Fair.

The Fourth of July brings events celebrating the United States' independence, including a parade and a large fireworks display in the evening.

With an average daily attendance of more than 60,000 in 2014, it is the fourth largest fair in North America, and California's largest ever, surpassed in attendance only by the State Fair of Texas, Houston Livestock Show and Rodeo, and the Minnesota State Fair.

Date and location

The fair is generally held from the last weekend in May (early June otherwise) through the Fourth of July weekend, and is closed Mondays/Tuesdays in June.

The fair is held at the Del Mar Fairgrounds in Del Mar, California, off the Via De La Valle exit (Exit 36) on the Interstate 5 Freeway. The address is 2260 Jimmy Durante Blvd., Del Mar, CA 92014.

Pacific Surfliner and Coaster stop at the nearby Solana Beach station on regular schedules, and they usually increase service during the events of the fair (NCTD uses their "Fair Tripper" ticket packages for discounts and Amtrak increases capacity). There are plans in the future to build a special events platform on the west side of the Del Mar Fairgrounds to provide easier access to events held there, such as the fair.

Parking
The Del Mar Fairgrounds charges $17 for parking in their main lots during the San Diego Fair.

There are multiple free and reduced fee options for parking during the fair that includes free shuttle service to help combat traffic and parking problems.

 Torrey Pines High School, 3710 Del Mar Heights Rd., Del Mar       Saturdays and Sundays
 MiraCosta College's San Elijo Campus, 3333 Manchester Ave., Cardiff     Saturdays and Sundays
 Del Mar Horsepark (just east of the fair), 14550 El Camino Real, Del Mar  everyday fair is open ($5)

Themes
Since 1998 the San Diego County Fair has adopted a theme.

 1998 - Discover California
 1999 - The Rush is On (California Sesquicentennial)
 2000 - California Dreamin'
 2001 - Endless Summer - Endless Fun (Surfing)
 2002 - Elvis Presley
 2003 - Commotion by the Ocean
 2004 - Seussentennial Celebration
 2005 - Cinema Summer
 2006 - Ride the Tide to Fun
 2007 - Salute to Heroes
 2008 - Summer of Sports
 2009 - Music Mania
 2010 - Taste the Fun
 2011 - Race to The Fair
 2012 - Out of This World
 2013 - Game On!
 2014 - The FAB Fair
 2015 - A Fair to Remember
 2016 - Mad About the Fair
 2017 - Where the West is Fun
 2018 - How Sweet it is
 2019 - OzSome!
 2020 - (No 2020 Fair in response to the COVID-19 pandemic)
 2021 - Home Grown Fun
 2022 - Heroes ReUnite!
 2023 - Get Out There!

In 2003, Spanish versions of the theme were created to spearhead marketing campaigns for the Hispanic community in San Diego County plus Baja California:

 2003 - Una Feria a Todo Mar
 2004 - (No Spanish version adopted)
 2005 - De Película
 2006 - Va Llena de Diversión
 2007 - Homenaje a los Héroes
 2008 - Verano Deportivo
 2009 - Explosión Musical
 2010 - ¡Pruébala!
 2011 - Arráncate a la Feria
 2012 - La Feria de las Galaxias
 2013 - ¡Juega!
 2014 - Una Feria Fabulosa
 2015 - La Feria del Recuerdo
 2016 - Locos por la Feria
 2017 - La Gran Feria del Oeste
 2018 - La Más Dulce de las Ferias
 2019 - ¡fabulOZa!
 2020 - (No 2020 Fair in response to the COVID-19 pandemic)
 2021 - (No Spanish version adopted)
 2022 - Héroes ¡Reúnanse!
 2023 - ¡Explórala!

References

External links
San Diego County Fair website
Del Mar Fairgrounds website

Festivals in San Diego
Fairs in California
Del Mar, California
Annual fairs
Annual events in California
Tourist attractions in San Diego County, California